Leonard Berman (born June 14, 1947) is an American television sportscaster and journalist who is based in New York City. He is currently hosting the morning show on WOR-AM along with Michael Riedel.

Berman is widely known for his television career with NBC, specifically his work for the network's flagship station WNBC-TV. Berman spent 27 years as the lead sports anchor for WNBC and also worked for NBC Sports covering Major League Baseball and the National Football League. He was employed by WNBC until 2009, and prior to that he worked for WCBS-TV in New York City from April 1979 through August 1982 and WBZ-TV in Boston, where he announced Boston Celtics games on TV with Celtics legend Bob Cousy.  He also worked at HBO Sports covering boxing, college basketball and a weekly baseball show Race for the Pennant from 1978-1981.

Early life
Berman graduated from the Syracuse University's S. I. Newhouse School of Public Communications in 1968. He also earned a masters degree there in 1970. While at Syracuse, he was the sports director at WAER-FM calling Syracuse Orange games. He was inducted into WAER Hall of Fame in 2018 along with Steve Kroft. 

Despite having a very neutral viewpoint when reporting sports in New York City, he grew up an avid New York Yankees fan. He is partial to Big East basketball. Berman's Big East connections included, other being a Syracuse alum, several years of calling the conference's basketball games for ESPN and in syndication for the Big East Network.

Career
On March 1, 2012, Berman hosted a segment on the 10 o'clock news evening sports report on WNYW—Fox 5—in New York City. He presented his top-5 most interesting sports stories of the week prior.

In March 2015, Berman co-hosted a morning radio program from 6:00 a.m. to 10:00am on WOR-AM. The flagship news-talk station for iHeart Radio, originally named "Len and Todd in the Morning".

On October 20, 2017, Berman announced during a broadcast that Todd Schnitt was no longer working at the station because he could not come to terms on a contract. The show is now called "Len Berman and Michael Riedel in the Morning."

Berman announced his last WNBC's sportscast on Wednesday April 22, 2009. Following the announcement, the station showed taped goodbye and good luck messages from Matt Lauer, Al Roker, and Brian Williams.

Spanning the World
One popular monthly feature Berman responsible for is Spanning the World which aired on WNBC-TV's newscasts and The Today Show. Spanning is a reel of odd and interesting sports highlights from the past month, with a recorded introduction and closing by Don Pardo. When the segment begins, the world is torn in two with the sound of a rooster crowing playing. When the segment ends, the world goes back to its "pre-torn" state. With the same rooster sound, announcer Don Pardo says "Tune in next time for Spanning the World, if there is a next time. I'm Don Pardo." In his last WNBC broadcast, Berman mentioned that the segment would continue on The Today Show. Berman would occasionally do a version of the segment for WNBC titled "Spanning the Week". Thus, would review odd and interesting stories from the past week.  A common catchphrase from the segment said by Berman "And nobody got hurt!" after a clip featuring some sort of accident that might have caused injury.

Sports on NBC
From 1982 to part of 1984, Berman also hosted The NFL on NBC Pregame Show, then known as NFL (insert year), until he was supplanted by Bob Costas. During the early weeks of the 1988 NFL season, Berman served as the host of what was, by that time, called NFL Live! while regular host Costas was hosting NBC's coverage of the 1988 Summer Olympics in Seoul, South Korea. Berman hosted Super Bowl XVII in Pasadena.  He also hosted the Baseball Game of the Week for NBC and co-hosted the 1984 World Series.

Live at Five
In 2005, he was one of a handful of rotating co-anchors with Sue Simmons on Live at Five after Jim Rosenfield left for WCBS-TV.

Awards
He is the winner of eight Emmy Awards and a 6-time New York State Sportscaster of the Year.  He has been inducted into the New York State Broadcasters Hall of Fame, the National Jewish Sports Hall of Fame, and the WAER Radio Hall of Fame (Syracuse University).

Berman's blog
From 2008 until 2015, Len wrote a blog and daily newsletter, "Len Berman Sports", at LenBermanSports.com. Using the form to continue his type of humor and whimsical sports stories.

Berman published books
Berman has written six books and five children's books:

 Spanning the World.
 And Nobody Got Hurt! (Volumes I and II). 
 The Greatest Moments in Sports (New York Times Bestseller).
 The 25 Greatest Baseball Players of All Time. 
 Greatest Moments in Sports.
 Upsets and Underdogs.

Personal life
Berman resides in Port Washington, New York.

See also
 New Yorkers in journalism

References

External links
The Career Cookbook Len Berman Profile
Len Berman Sports
Len Berman on Obsessed TV
Len Berman on Big Apple Channel

1947 births
Living people
21st-century American Jews
American television reporters and correspondents
American television sports anchors
Boston Celtics announcers
Boxing commentators
College basketball announcers in the United States
Jewish American sportspeople
Major League Baseball broadcasters
National Football League announcers
National Basketball Association broadcasters
New England Patriots announcers
New York (state) television reporters
Olympic Games broadcasters
People from Brooklyn
People from Port Washington, New York
Radio personalities from New York City
S.I. Newhouse School of Public Communications alumni
Stuyvesant High School alumni
Television anchors from Boston
Television anchors from New York City